The 1985–86 Campionato Sammarinese di Calcio season was the 1st season since its establishment. Seventeen teams competed and S.C. Faetano won the championship.

League standings

Results

References
San Marino - List of final tables (RSSSF)

Campionato Sammarinese di Calcio
San
Campionato